Paszek is a Polish surname. Notable people include:

 Daria Paszek (born 1991), Polish volleyball player
 Rudolf Paszek (1894–1969), Polish teacher, national activist, community organizer and politician
 Tamira Paszek (born 1990), Austrian tennis player

Polish-language surnames